Strings and Bling is the second studio album by South African hip hop and rap artist Nasty C. It was released by Universal Music Group on July 6, 2018. At the 25th South African Music Awards the album won the Best Hip Hop album and Best produced album.

Release  
On July 6, 2018, Nasty C released his second studio album, Strings and Bling. The album release was preceded by three singles: "Jungle", Strings And Bling features guest appearances from American rapper A$AP Ferg, Rowlene and Kaien Cruz.

Reception 
Time Live, a South African news website, noted, "Strings and Bling is worth your money and time". It was certified Platinum by the Recording Industry of South Africa.

Track listing

Charts

Certifications

Release history

References 

Nasty C albums
2018 albums
Albums produced by Tweezy